I'm a Scientist, Get me out of here! is an online science enrichment activity that runs throughout term-time in the UK. School students interact with scientists in text-based live chats in themed 'Zones'. At the end of the event the school students vote for their favourite scientist and the winner is awarded prize money to support further science communication.

Background 
Pilots for I'm a Scientist, Get me out of here began in 2008, and were well received by school students and teachers. It was founded by Shane McCracken of Gallomanor Communications. The activity is divided into several zones, which focus on either general science or a specific industry. The funding for each zone is provided by an associated learned society, organisation or industry. Prior to 2020, the competition format was similar to The X Factor, and school students vote for the winner based on answers they receive to their questions submitted online and in live, text-based chats with the scientists. During the COVID-19 pandemic, I’m a Scientist became an 'on demand' activity with Zones lasting longer, and scientists staying until the end of each Zone. Participating scientists are given an opportunity to develop their communication skills whilst school students and teachers benefit from contact time with a real-life, practising scientist. The competition is also run for engineers, geoscientists, medics and astronauts, and many more.

The activity takes place annually in the UK, Ireland and Spain. It has also run in previous years in the United States, Malaysia, Kenya, Vietnam, Germany and Australia.

Winners

I'm a Scientist (UK)

Winners 2010 – 2014

Winners 2015 – 2019

Winners 2020 –

I'm in Space (UK) 
Winners 2022 -

I'm an Engineer (UK)

Winners 2012 – 2016

Winners 2017 – 2021 

Winners 2022 -

I'm a Medic (UK)

I'm a Scientist (Ireland)

Winners 2012 – 2016

Winners 2017 – 2021 

Winners 2022-

I'm an Engineer (Ireland) 

Winners 2014 – 2017

Winners 2018 – 2022

I'm a Geoscientist (Europe)

 Anna Rabitti
 Andreas Rudersdorf

I'm a Mathematician (UK) 

 Sarah Brown

I'm a Mathematician (Ireland) 

 Daniel McAleese

I'm a Scientist (USA) 

 Amelia Grose
 Srishti Baid

References 

Secondary schools in the United Kingdom
Science communication
Science education in the United Kingdom
Wellcome Trust